Hippeastreae is a tribe of plants belonging to the subfamily Amaryllidoideae of the Amaryllis family (Amaryllidaceae). Species in this tribe are distributed in South America. Flowers are large and showy, zygomorphic, with the stamens in varying lengths, inflorescence bracts are often fused basally (along one side). The seeds are flattened, winged or D-shaped. Reported basic chromosome numbers are x= 8-13, 17, and higher. All the species in this tribe present a remarkable aesthetic interest and horticultural value.

Taxonomy 
Meerow et al. (1999) provide a history of the treatment of the genera of Amaryllidaceae, including Hippeastreae, from the mid-twentieth century. While morphological phylogeny has been frustrated by the perversive homoplasy typical of the Amaryllidaceae, application of molecular phylogenetics to the Amaryllidaceae did not indicate clear tribal divisions but rather broad biogeographical clades. However the American clade resolved the tribe Hippeastreae. A later examination of the deeper relationships of the American genera suggested the two subclades, Andean and hippeastroid and within the latter separated the Brazilian Griffineae as sister to the remaining hippeastroids. The larger and more diverse grouping of hippeastroids formed two smaller monophyletic groups. The smaller contained Hippeastrum (with the exception of Hippeastrum blumenavium), but also a Rhodophiala. With the exception of Rodophilia (Brazil) all specimens were from Chile and Argentina. The second group corresponded to those genera variously included in tribe Zephyrantheae (Traub) or subtribe Zephyranthinae (Müller-Doblies), but only including some Zephyranthes species. The hippeastroid clade is predominantly diploid and extra-Andean by comparison to the Andean clade which is predominantly tetraploid, and contain those genera traditionally included in Hippeastreae. The precise position of Griffineae remained unresolved since its sister status to Hippeastrae was weak, leaving the possibility that it could be sister to the whole American clade. The tribe consists of 10–13 genera and about 180 species.

Phylogeny 
The placement of Hippeastreae within subfamily Amaryllidoideae is shown in the
following cladogram, where this tribe is shown as a sister group to the Griffineae, forming the Hippeastroid subclade, of two American clades:

Subdivision 

The genera of the tribe Hippeastreae have been treated in a number of different ways over the years. Traub (1963) in his monograph on the Amaryllidacea distributed those genera now considered in this tribe over a number of other tribes (see Table, below), while Dahlgren et al. included them all under Hippeastrae for the first time. The concept of subtribes came from the Müller-Doblies' (1996), who had three subtribes, Griffinineae, Hippeastrinae and Zephyranthinae.

Consequently, it has been customary to describe the tribe Hippeastreae as consisting of two subtribes:
 subtribe Hippeastrinae - includes species of medium height and often with many flowers in each inflorescence and inflorescence bracts are different in size and fused basally. Genera that have been placed in this subtribe include Placea, Hippeastrum, Phycella (includes Famatina), Eithea (=Griffiniopsis), Rhodophiala, and  Traubia. (Some authors use the spelling Hippeastrineae)
 subtribe Zephyranthinae - includes species of small height with solitary flowers. Inflorescence bracts are fused forming a tube  surrounding the pedicel of the flower. Genera in this subtribe are Sprekelia, Habranthus, Cooperia, and Zephyranthes. (Some authors use the spelling Zephyranthinea)

In the study of Meerow et al. (2000) based on molecular markers Zephyranthinae (Zephyranthae of Traub) were clearly polyphyletic, largely due to the polyphyly of Zephyranthes itself. This subgroup has been broadly characterised as having a chromosome number, x=6, but with considerable variation. Other polyphyletic genera included Rodophiala and Habranthus. Hippeastreae also include Haylockia, Rhodolirion and Tocantinia.

A more focused study of Hippeastreae alone in 2014, resolved two major clades:
 Clade A: Traubia, Placea, Phycella, Rhodolirium, and Famatina maulensis (now Phycella maulensis)
 Clade B: Rhodophiala, Habranthus, Haylockia, Hippeastrum, Sprekelia, Zephyranthes, and the remainder of Famatina.

However it also showed that of the 13 genera, two are monotypic (Haylockia and Traubia). Of the remaining 11 genera, based on Internal transcribed spacer (ITS) sequences the only monophyletic non-monotypic genera were Hippeastrum (about 60 species) and Sprekelia (2 species). But on  chloroplast DNA (cpDNA) analysis, not even these genera were monophyletic. This brings into question the existing generic classification within Hippeastreae.
Consequently, the authors proposed the following nomenclature:
 Subtribe Traubiinae (Clade A) D.Müll.-Doblies & U.Müll.-Doblies
 Subtribe Hippeastrinae (Clade B)

A major generic recircumscription was published in 2019, although the basic subdivision into the two above subtribes remained unchanged.

Subtribes 

Subtribe Traubiinae  D. & U. Müll.-Doblies (Clade A) includes about 20 endemic Chilean taxa, but only about 10% of the species within tribe Hippeastreae. Characterisation includes a haploid chromosome number, x=8, lack of polyploidy and a capitate stigma. 4 genera.

Subtribe Hippeastrinae Walp. (Clade B), by contrast has a variable chromosome number, x=6–11, with frequent aneuploidy and polyploidy. Although there are no unique synapomorphies, most taxa exhibit a trifid or trilobed stigma, although in a few it is capitate. 2 genera.

Historical circumscription 

Tribe Hippeastreae has included various numbers of genera over the years, some of which were monotypic.

Genera
, the Angiosperm Phylogeny Website (APweb) accepted only six genera in the tribe Hippeastrae: shown here as amended by Garcia et al 2019.
 Subtribe Traubiinae:
 Eremolirion Nic.Garcia (now Paposoa)
 Phycella Lindlley
 Pyrolirion Herbert (now part of a separate tribe, Eustephieae)
 Rhodolirium s.str. Phil.
 Traubia Moldenke

 Subtribe Hippeastrinae
 Hippeastrum Herbert
 Zephyranthes Herbert

Genera that have been synonymized with other genera in the tribe according to APweb include:
Cooperia Herbert = Zephyranthes
Famatina Ravenna = Zephyranthes
Habranthus Herbert = Zephyranthes
Haylockia Herbert = Zephyranthes
Placea Miers = Phycella
Rhodolirium Philippi = Phycella
Rhodophiala C. Presl = Phycella
Sprekelia Heister = Zephyranthes
Tocantina Ravenna = Hippeastrum

Distribution and habitat 

Hippeastreae have a major center of diversification in central Chile and western (Andean) Argentina, together with minor centres in eastern Brazil, the north east of Argentina and with more distant centers in Mexico, the Greater Antilles and southern United States (Habranthus, Zephyranthes).

Uses 
The economic significance of the tribe lies in its horticultural usage.

Notes

References

Bibliography

Books 

 
 
 
 Volume 1: Monocotyledonae (1926)
 Volume 2: Dicotyledonae (1934)
 
   (excerpts)

Articles

Websites

External links 
 Amaryllidaceae project at eMonocot

Amaryllidoideae
Asparagales tribes